Sharpshooter is a 2007 American made-for-television action film starring James Remar, Bruce Boxleitner, Mario Van Peebles and Catherine Mary Stewart. It was written by Steven H. Berman and directed by Armand Mastroianni. It was shown in the United Kingdom on the British television channel Sky Three on October 11, 2007.

Plot 
An assassin working for the CIA decides to take one final job before quitting only to find out that he is the target of his CIA boss.

Cast
 James Remar as Dillon
 Mario Van Peebles as Flick
 Catherine Mary Stewart as Amy
 Bruce Boxleitner as Sheriff Gardner
 Al Sapienza as Phillips
 McKinley Freeman as Andre

References

External links
 
 

2007 television films
2007 films
2000s action adventure films
American television films
American action films
American action adventure films
Sonar Entertainment films
Films directed by Armand Mastroianni
2000s American films